Lajja is a 2001 Indian Hindi-language crime drama film produced and directed by Rajkumar Santoshi. Based on the plight of women and feminism in India, the film satirizes the honor with which women are placed in society and the restrictions imposed on them. The fact that the names of four women (Maithili, Janki, Ramdulaari, and Vaidehi) are all versions of Sita, the ideal Hindu woman's name, is a message in itself. It features Manisha Koirala in the lead role as Vaidehi, the mistreated woman, while an ensemble cast of Rekha, Anil Kapoor, Madhuri Dixit, Ajay Devgn, Jackie Shroff, Mahima Chaudhry, Johnny Lever, Suresh Oberoi, Sharman Joshi, Danny Dengzongpa, Razak Khan, Gulshan Grover and Aarti Chhabria appear in supporting roles.  

Lajja failed commercially in India but was a major commercial success in the overseas. It received mixed reviews, but the performances from the lead actors were highly praised. 

At the 47th Filmfare Awards, Lajja was nominated for 3 awards – Best Supporting Actor (Devgn) and Best Supporting Actress (for both Rekha and Dixit). At the 2002 Zee Cine Awards, it won Best Supporting Actress (Dixit).

Plot 
Vaidehi (Manisha Koirala) is married to the rich Raghu (Jackie Shroff) Outside, she has a sophisticated life but inside, Raghu is abusive and has extramarital affairs. Later, she is banished from the household. She returns to her parents' house, but they reject her as her running away from Raghu taints their family's reputation. She soon finds out she is pregnant.

Raghu gets into a car accident and is left impotent. Upon knowing Vaidehi's pregnancy, he calls her, faking remorse, and asks for her to return. She agrees, thinking Raghu has mended his ways. In reality, he and his father plot for the baby to become their heir and if Vaidehi intervenes, she will be killed. A friend informs Vaidehi of Raghu's true intentions and she escapes from his henchmen.

Raju ( Anil Kapoor) a petty but kind-hearted thief helps Vaidehi, hears her story and gives her money so that she can go to Haripur. They gatecrash a wedding, Vaidehi meets the bride Maithili ( Mahima Chaudhary ), a middle-class girl marrying the groom who is rich. The two see the groom's father Mr. Hazarilal harassing Maithili's father with demands for an opulent wedding which is unaffordable and forcing him to pay dowry, with his reputation in society being ruined if he fails.

Vaidehi tries to convince Raju to give Maithili's father his money from the heist. He refuses and is soon forced to escape as somebody has recognized him as a gatecrasher. Changing his mind, he returns to give his heist money to Vaidehi. The groom's friend Gulshan attempts to rape Maithili but is stopped by Raju. One of the guests Gulab Chand recognizes the heist money which Raju had stolen from him before gatecrashing the wedding.

Moreover, Gulshan tells the groom's family that he spotted Raju in Maithili's room. She is accused of sexual relations with him in return for money, which leads Raju to publicly acknowledge his theft. Maithili insults the groom's family, and they flee from the wedding. Raghu finds and forces Vaidehi into returning home. On the way, they encounter a protest mob. Raghu gets out to investigate thus giving Vaidehi a chance to escape.

Vaidehi arrives in a small town, Haripur and meets Janki, a theatre actress in love with her colleague, Manish. She is pregnant but not married, and doesn't care for society's norms. The older theatre director Purushottam lusts after Janki, but keeps his younger wife, Lata confined to their house. He badmouths Janki to Manish, creating a rift. Manish asks her to abort the child as he suspects it isn't his, indirectly accusing Janki of sexual relations with Purushottam.

Outraged, Janki intentionally botches a scene during a performance of the Ramayan. The angered audience assaults her, causing her to miscarry. Vaidehi confronts Purshottam, who threatens to call Raghu. However, Lata intervenes and puts her on a train at the railway station. Vaidehi's train is robbed by bandits but Bhulwa, a kind-hearted local dacoit saves the passengers.

Vaidehi faints at the sight of blood. Bhulwa takes her to the local midwife Ramdulari who bravely opposes the village leaders Virendra and Gajendra as they exploit innocent women, young and old. Tensions escalate when Ramdulari's educated son Prakash, who tries to educate the villagers about what Virendra and Gajendra are doing, falls in love with Gajendra's daughter Sushma. Gajendra locks Ramdulaari in her house and sets out to find Prakash.

He also locks away Vaidehi in his home to be rewarded by Raghu by returning her to him. Prakash elopes with Sushma; whilst Virendra and Gajendra rape and burn Ramdulari alive. In a fit of rage, Bhulwa and his army kill Virendra and his goons, though being severely injured. Vaidehi escapes with Sushma and Prakash. Gajendra attempts to enter politics, so when he is applauded by the local authorities, Vaidehi intervenes and exposes him as a rapist and a murderer. 

She delivers a heart-wrenching speech how women are only treated as burdens to be married off by their families or ways to get dowry and male heirs by their in-laws. This drives all the women in the audience to assault Gajendra, whom Bhulwa kills later. The speech changes Raghu's attitude for Vaidehi and he turns better. They return to New York City as a proper married couple.

Vaidehi gives birth to a daughter and named her Ramdulari. She reunites with Raju, who is now a taxi driver married to Maithili. Vaidehi invites him to a charity dance show with Janki in the main role, wherein all the money from her shows goes to fund women's organizations in India.

Cast
Rekha as Ramdulaari
Manisha Koirala as Vaidehi
Madhuri Dixit as Janki
Mahima Chaudhary as Maithili
Anil Kapoor as Raju, a petty thief
Ajay Devgan as Bhulwa, the dacoit
Jackie Shroff as Raghu
Danny Denzongpa as Gajendra Thakur
Gulshan Grover as Virendra Thakur
Nasirr Khan as Gulshan alias Gullu
Aarti Chhabria as Sushma Thakur, Gajendra's daughter.
Sharman Joshi as Prakash, Ramdulaari's son.
Beena Banerjee as Vaidehi's mother
Suresh Oberoi as Raghu's father
Johnny Lever as Fakhruddin  (Raghu's henchman).
Razak Khan as Francis (Raghu's henchman).
Anjan Srivastav as Nekchand, Maithili's father.
Farida Jalal as Saroj, Maithili's mother. 
Tinnu Anand as Purshottam
Jaya Bhattacharya as Lata
Asrani as Gulab Chand
Dina Pathak as Maithili's paternal aunt.
Govind Namdeo as Mr. Hazarilal
Jagdeep as Bansidhar Chakkiwala (cameo)
Ritu Shivpuri as Anita
Rohini Hattangadi as Mrs. Hazarilal
Viju Khote as Damodar, Brother-in-law of Hazarilal.
Ghanashyam Nayak as Tiku, Prompter at Purshottam Drama Company.
Suhas Bhalekar as a member of Purshottam Drama Company.
Samir Soni as Manish
Anupam Shyam as Pimp of Prostitute girls.
Subrat Dutta
Sonali Bendre as herself in song "Saajan Ke Ghar Jaana Hai" (special appearance)
Urmila Matondkar as herself in song "Aaye Aajaye" (special appearance)
Gopi Bhalla

Music
The songs were mainly composed by Anu Malik. A. R. Rahman was initially signed in as the composer; but then he opted out; after he got extremely busy with his international assignment,  Bombay Dreams. Then, the background score for the movie was done by Illayaraja. Lyrics of all songs were also written by Sameer, except those of "Kaun Dagar Kaun Shehar", which were written by Prasoon Joshi. This song was also composed by Illayaraja and was sung by Lata Mangeshkar. According to the Indian trade website Box Office India, with around 13,00,000 units sold, this film's soundtrack album was the year's fifteenth highest-selling.

Awards and nominations

Reviews
The film received mixed reviews, however the performances from the lead actors were highly praised.
 
Bollywood Hungama gave a rating of two and half out of five stars and said "On the whole, Lajja is a purposeful film within commercial parameters and the best part is that the Indian masses will be able to identify with the goings-on. An enviable star cast, a talented director and an excellent second half are amongst its strong points." The Hindu stated "Unfortunately, this colourful film is a black-and-white disappointment, particularly in the second half when Santoshi loses track of his story and in a blatant bid to get the tax-free certificate brings in bits about computer education, female literacy and infanticide.". The BBC gave a positive review saying "The film is well directed, excellent songs, although they should have had more realistic fights."

Box office
Lajja failed commercially at the box office in India due to high budget and distribution price. However it tasted success overseas. It ranked 14th on the British box-office chart, according to the Internet Movie Database.

References

External links 
 
 Lajja at Bollywood Hungama

2001 films
2001 crime drama films
Films about women in India
Films directed by Rajkumar Santoshi
2000s Hindi-language films
Films scored by Anu Malik
Films scored by Ilaiyaraaja
Indian crime drama films
Films about social issues in India
Films about domestic violence
Films about rape in India